John Semple may refer to:
 John Semple (minister) (c. 1602–c. 1677), Ulster-Scots Presbyterian minister and Scots Worthy
 John Semple (architect) (1801–1882), Irish architect
 John Semple (footballer) (1889–?), Scottish footballer
 Jock Semple (1903–1988), Scots-American sports official and trainer
 John Greenlees Semple (1904–1985), British mathematician
 John Semple (civil servant) (born 1940), former head of the Northern Ireland Civil Service
 John W. Semple (born 1959), Canadian medical researcher
 John C. Semple, American botanist